Parapelecopsis is a genus of dwarf spiders that was first described by J. Wunderlich in 1992. The spider is found in woodlands in leaf litter, pine needles, moss at ground level and lichen and moss on tree trunks.

Species
 it contains four species:
Parapelecopsis conimbricensis Bosmans & Crespo, 2010 – Portugal
Parapelecopsis mediocris (Kulczyński, 1899) – Madeira
Parapelecopsis nemoralioides (O. Pickard-Cambridge, 1884) – Europe
Parapelecopsis nemoralis (Blackwall, 1841) (type) – Europe, Georgia

See also
 List of Linyphiidae species (I–P)

References

Araneomorphae genera
Linyphiidae
Spiders of Russia